Pour une Âme Souveraine: A Dedication to Nina Simone is the 10th studio album by American singer Meshell Ndegeocello, released in October 2012 on Naïve label.

Track listing
"Please Don't Let Me Be Misunderstood" (Claude Bennie Benjamin, Gloria Caldwell, Sol Marcus) – 4:08
"Suzanne" (Leonard Cohen) – 4:27
"Real Real" (Nina Simone) – 3:08
"House of the Rising Sun" (Josh White, Libby Reynolds Holmes) – 3:36
"Turn Me On" (John D. Loudermilk) – 3:08
"Feeling Good" (Anthony George Newley, Leslie Bricusse) – 4:10
"Don't Take All Night" (Benjamin, Marcus) – 3:28
"Nobody's Fault but Mine" (traditional) – 2:37
"Be My Husband" (Andrew Benjamin Stroud) – 3:31
"Black Is the Colour of My True Loves Hair" (traditional) – 3:53
"See Line Woman" (George Bass, Nina Simone) – 5:51
"Either Way I Lose" (Van McCoy) – 3:29
"To Be Young, Gifted and Black" (Nina Simone) – 3:16
"Four Women" (Nina Simone) – 5:02

Personnel 
Meshell Ndegeocello – bass
Chris Bruce – guitar
Jebin Bruni – keyboards, piano
Deantoni Parks – drums
Toshi Reagon – vocals on "Real Real" and "House of the Rising Sun"
Sinéad O'Connor – vocals on "Don't Take All Night"
Lizz Wright – vocals on "Nobody's Fault but Mine"
Valerie June – vocals on "Be My Husband"
Tracy Wannomae – soprano saxophone and flute on "See Line Woman" and "To Be Young, Gifted and Black"
Eric Elterman – engineer (vocals)
Pete Min – engineer, mixing, mastering
Hilton Als – liner notes
Charlie Gross – photography

References

2012 albums
Meshell Ndegeocello albums
Tribute albums
Nina Simone